Pacific Island Air is an Air Charter company operating out of Nadi International Airport, Fiji.

History

Pacific Island Seaplanes was established in 1999 by Larry 'Dusty' Simon. The air charter company initially operated two de Havilland Canada DHC-2 Beavers and a Britten-Norman Islander aircraft. Pacific Island Seaplanes was acquired by the Christchurch, New Zealand based GCH Aviation in 2013. GCH merged their existing Helicopters (Fiji) operation with Pacific Island Seaplanes to form Pacific Island Air (PIA).

Services
The airline offers daily services to Mamanuca Island Resorts and most Yasawa Island Resorts utilizing seaplanes and helicopters as well as charter flights to Mana Island and Malololailai from Nadi domestic airport using 6 seat Britten-Norman Islander aircraft.  Pacific Island Air facilitates daily charter based transfers and scenic flights from Nadi International Airport to any resort in Fiji. Destinations include resorts on the Coral Coast, Royal Davui, Nanuku, Savu Savu, Tavenui, Suva, Levuka, Wakaya, Vatulele, Kadavu, Moala, Gau, Koro, Vanua Balavu, Lakeba, Cicia, Labasa. It also provides air ambulance/emergency medical service flights to/from all inhabited islands in Fiji. Lastly, Pacific Island Air provides custom charter air services to tourists, local businesses and Fijian government agencies.

Company Locations

Pacific Island Air employs over 50 staff encompassing management, administration, engineering, flight crew, reservations, check-in and baggage handling. The company headquarters and hangar is located at CAAF Compound, London Avenue, Namaka, Fiji with primary check-in located at the Domestic Terminal, Nadi International Airport. The company has two additional dedicated transfer/landing sites. One is located at Sheraton Fiji Resort, Denarau Island and the other is a floating pontoon moored off Port Denarau Marina.

Fleet

Pacific Island Air uses fixed wing, amphibious fixed wing and rotary aircraft in its daily operations. It currently operates:

 2 x de Havilland Canada DHC-3 Otter (registration DQ-PIA - S/N 115, DQ-SEA - S/N 397) - 10 passenger amphibious aircraft
 2 x Britten-Norman Islander (registrations DQ-SLM, DQ-YIR) - 6 passenger aircraft
 1 x Eurocopter AS350 (registration DQ-HUG) - 6 passenger helicopter
 2 x Eurocopter AS355 (registrations DQ-HFJ, DQ-HFT) - 6 passenger helicopter

See also

References

External links
 
 GCH Aviation

Airlines of Fiji
Seaplane operators